Streptomyces polaris is a bacterium species from the genus of Streptomyces which has been isolated from frozen soil from the Arctic.

See also 
 List of Streptomyces species

References 

polaris
Bacteria described in 2019